Krystyna Klimczak (born 24 September 1992 in Oświęcim, Poland) is a Polish former competitive figure skater who competed as a single skater and pair skater. As a pair skater, she competed with Janusz Karweta. They were the 2007 Polish national silver medalists. They received the host wildcard entry to the 2007-2008 Junior Grand Prix Final, where they placed 9th. Their partnership ended in 2009.

Although they placed ninth on the day, they were later moved up a spot to an eighth-place finish at the 2007-2008 Junior Grand Prix Final following the retroactive disqualification of first-place-finishers Vera Bazarova & Yuri Larionov due to a positive doping sample from Larionov.

She competed as a single skater on the national level.

Competitive highlights

Pairs career
(with Karweta)

 J = Junior level

Singles career

 N = Novice level

References

External links
 
 Krystyna Klimczak at the UKŁF "Unia" Oświęcim

Polish female pair skaters
Polish female single skaters
1992 births
Living people
People from Oświęcim
Sportspeople from Lesser Poland Voivodeship